Ostre  is a village in the administrative district of Gmina Lipowa, within Żywiec County, Silesian Voivodeship, in southern Poland.

The village was established in the early 17th century on the slopes of Ostre mountain in Silesian Beskids, originally named Podostre. The village has a population of 474.

References

Ostre